Salvino Busuttil (1936 - May 12, 2016) was a Maltese economist, ambassador to France, and philosopher. In philosophy he specialised in economics and international relations.

Life
Busuttil was born at Floriana, Malta, in 1936.

He studied philosophy at the Gregorian University in Rome, Italy from which he acquired a licentiate in 1959. He acquired a Doctorate in Philosophy from the Angelicum University in Rome in 1961 with a dissertation entitled Value in Karl Marx .  In 1963 he earned a Doctorate in Economy from the University of Manchester. After returning to Malta Busuttil was appointed Professor and Head of the Department of Economics at the University of Malta in 1964, an office he held up till 1975. Two years later, in 1966, he was chosen as Head of the Faculty of Arts until 1972.

From 1987 till 1996 Busuttil was General Director of the Foundation of International Studies at the University of Malta. Both on a local as well as on an international level he occupied various positions of responsibility related to the economy and the environment, especially with UNESCO.

Works
Busuttil published various works. Some of them, like those dealing with purely economic matters, are not of direct interest to philosophy. Others, however, contain significant philosophical value. Amongst these one can find the following:

 1963 - Value in Marx.
 1969 - Philosophical and Economical Foundations of the Marxian Theory of Value.
 1990 – A Note on Economic Responsibility Towards Future Generations (in Our Responsibilities Towards Future Generations).
 1994 – Protecting Our Common Future (in What Future for Future Generations?).
 1994 – Foreword (in The Search for Peace in the Mediterranean Region).
 1994 – The Role of Universities in the Quest for Peace in the Mediterranean (in The Search for Peace in the Mediterranean Region).
 1998 – Preface (in Future Generations and International Law).

Busuttil coedited a number of book of philosophical interest, namely:

 1990 - Our Responsibilities Towards Future Generations (with Emmanuel Agius, Peter Serracino Inglott, and Tony Macelli).
 1991 - Directions in the Study of Peace Education (with James Calleja, and Helena Kekkonen).
 1994 - What Future for Future Generations? (with Emmanuel Agius).
 1996 - Interfaces (with Joe Friggieri).
 1998 - Future Generations & International Law (with Emmanuel Agius).
 1998 - Germ-Line Intervention and our Responsibilities to Future Generations (with Emmanuel Agius).

References

Sources

See also
Philosophy in Malta

20th-century Maltese philosophers
1936 births
Living people
People from Floriana
Pontifical Gregorian University alumni
Pontifical University of Saint Thomas Aquinas alumni
Alumni of the University of Manchester
Ambassadors of Malta to France
Academic staff of the University of Malta